A.M.C.: Astro Marine Corps is a 1989 platform shooter video game developed by Creepsoft and published by Dinamic Software. It was released for the Amiga, Atari ST, Commodore 64, ZX Spectrum, MSX, and Amstrad CPC. The program as written by Pablo Ariza with music by José A. Martín.

Gameplay
The player controls a member of the eponymous Astro Marine Corps, on a mission to stop the Deathbringers, a conglomerate of multiple alien criminals, from launching a campaign to conquer the galaxy. To fulfill his mission, the marine must run from left to right, jumping over obstacles and shooting aliens that try to kill him. Colliding with the aliens or their shots will lower the marine's health bar, or in the case of some enemies even kill him outright, making him lose one of his four lives. From time to time, boxes containing power ups or booby traps drop from the sky, and the marine has to shoot them to reveal their contents. Power ups include health refills, grenades and various alternate shot types such as a flame thrower or a spread shot. The marine can also obtain temporary invulnerability, although it doesn't work with enemies that can kill him instantly.

The game is divided in two phases. Each phase must be completed in a limited amount of time, which is extended upon reaching various checkpoints. In the first phase, the marine has to reach the Deathbringers' ship landed on planet Dendar and hijack it. At the end of the phase, a boss alien, the Krauer, must be defeated. In the second phase, the marine must fight through the Deathbringers' home planet and destroy their leader, the Great Alien King, to end the invasion.

Reception
Retro Games Review felt the title was worth repeated play-throughs. ACE: Advanced Computer Entertainment felt the title was slick but straightforward. The One felt the game offered the "monster mashing" genre a "bit of class". ST Format thought it was no more than a competent shooter. Amiga Reviews felt the graphics were the best part. The games Machine wrote it was repetitive, clichéd, and unnecessarily hard. ZZtap64 felt it could pass as an accurate military sim.

References 

1989 video games
Amiga games
Amstrad CPC games
Atari ST games
Commodore 64 games
Dinamic Software games
MSX games
Run and gun games
Video games developed in Spain
ZX Spectrum games
Single-player video games